You're My Best Friend may refer to:

 You're My Best Friend (Don Williams album), 1975
 "You're My Best Friend" (Don Williams song), the title song
 "You're My Best Friend" (Queen song), 1975
 "You're My Best Friend" (That '70s Show), an episode of That '70s Show

See also
 My Best Friend (disambiguation)